Aggregate or aggregates may refer to:

Computing and mathematics
 collection of objects that are bound together by a root entity, otherwise known as an aggregate root. The aggregate root guarantees the consistency of changes being made within the aggregate by forbidding external objects from holding references to its members.
 Aggregate (data warehouse), a part of the dimensional model that is used to speed up query time by summarizing tables
 Aggregate analysis, a technique used in amortized analysis in computer science, especially in analysis of algorithms
 Aggregate class, a type of class supported by C++
 Aggregate data, in statistics, data combined from several measurements
 Aggregate function, aggregation function, in database management is a function wherein the values of multiple rows are grouped together to form a single summary value
 Aggregate Level Simulation Protocol (ALSP), a protocol and supporting software that enables simulations to interoperate with one another
 Aggregate root, a concept in the Domain-driven Design software development process
 Aggregate Server Access Protocol, used by the Reliable server pooling (RSerPool) framework
 Aggregate throughput, total throughput measured over all links and in all directions in a communication network

Economics
 Aggregate demand, the total demand for final goods and services during a specific time period in an economy
 Aggregate income, the total of all incomes in an economy without adjustments for inflation, taxation, or types of double counting
 Aggregate expenditure, a measure of national income
 Aggregate Spend (US), a process to monitor the total amount spent by healthcare manufacturers on individual healthcare professionals and organizations through payments and gifts of various kinds
 Aggregate supply, the total supply of goods and services produced during a specific time period in an economy

Religion
 Aggregate (Sanskrit, skandha; Pāli, khandha), in Buddhism, a category of sensory experiences
 Aggregates, in some Christian churches, are combinations of groupings of multiples of canonical hours (i.e., offices) that form a single religious service

Science

Biology
 Aggregate fruit, in botanical terminology, fruit that develops from the merging of ovaries originating from a single flower
 Aggregate species (Wiktionary) or Species aggregate, a named species representing a range of very closely related organisms

Materials science
 Aggregate (composite), in materials science, a component of a composite material that resists compressive stress
 Construction aggregate, materials used in construction, including sand, gravel, crushed stone, slag, or recycled crushed concrete

Other uses in science
 Aggregate (geology), a mass of crystals, rock particles, or soil particles
 Aggregate (rocket family), in rocketry, a set of experimental rocket designs developed in Nazi Germany

Arts, entertainment, and media
 Aggregate, in music, is a set of all twelve pitch classes, also known as the total chromatic
 The Aggregate, a 1988 album by Anthony Braxton and the Rova saxophone Quartet

Other uses
 Aggregate, in the social sciences, a gathering of people into a cluster or a crowd that does not form a true social group
 Aggregate Industries, a manufacturer of aggregate materials
 Aggregate score, in sport, is the sum of two scorelines in a two-legged match

See also
 Aggregates, West Virginia
 Aggregation (disambiguation)
 Aggregator (disambiguation)